Soucy is a surname. Notable people with the surname include:

Brigitte Soucy (born 1972), Canadian volleyball player
Christian Soucy (born 1970), Canadian ice hockey player
Carson Soucy (born 1994), Canadian ice hockey player
Danny Soucy, Canadian politician
Gaétan Soucy (born 1958), Canadian novelist
Gene Soucy, American aviator
Jean-Pierre Soucy (born 1952), Canadian politician
Mike Soucy (born 1971), American drummer
Peter Soucy, Canadian comedian and actor
Robert Soucy (born 1933), American historian